With Love is a 1976 album featuring The Who's Pete Townshend and others that is dedicated to their spiritual mentor Meher Baba.

Other appearances and backup artists include Billy Nicholls, Steve Humphries, Ronnie Lane, Ron Wood, Ron Geesin, Bruce Rowland, Lol Benbow, Paul Wyld, Peter Hope-Evans (of Medicine Head), Peter Banks (ex-Yes), Sydney Foxx, among others.

Other tribute albums which were produced by Pete Townshend and dedicated to Meher Baba include Happy Birthday, I Am, and Avatar (a compilation of the previous three albums, later released as Jai Baba).

Track listing
All songs written by Pete Townshend, except where noted.

Personnel 

 Peter Townshend - guitars, drums, synthesized flute, synthesizer
 Caleb Quaye - guitars, bass, drums 
 Billy Nichols - acoustic guitar, vocals 
 Ronnie Lane - bass guitar 
 George Turner - bass guitar 
 Ian McLagan - piano
 Bernie Schwartz - piano
 Roger Seiji - Hammond organ 
 Dave Hastlow - synthesizer
 Connie Ehmke, David Lawson - violas 
 Loel Miller - cello
 Stephanie Getz - flute 
 Littler Remer - clarinet
 David Overton - drums 
 Judy Ardine, Neal Crockett, Carol Leigh, Duce, Sonya Lawson, Mary Lewis - vocals 
 Ron Geesin - various instruments

References

 Personnel : https://www.thewho.net/bootlegs/cdssolo/ptiam1.html

External links
 Lyrics
 Pete Townshend solo album index
 Meher Baba Tribute Albums by Pete Townshend

1976 albums
Pete Townshend albums
Concept albums
Meher Baba tribute albums